Leucopis is a genus of flies in the family Chamaemyiidae. There are at least 20 described species in Leucopis.

Species
L. albipuncta Zetterstedt, 1855
L. americana Malloch, 1921
L. ancilla McAlpine, 1971
L. argentata Heeger, 1848
L. argenticollis Zetterstedt, 1848
L. astonei McAlpine, 1977
L. atratula Ratzburg, 1844
L. atrifacies Aldrich, 1925
L. atritarsis Tanasijtshuk, 1958
L. bellula Williston, 1889
L. bivittata Malloch, 1940
L. flavicornis Aldrich, 1914
L. geniculata Zetterstedt, 1855
L. glyphinivora Tanasijtshuk, 1958
L. griseola (Fallén, 1823)
L. hennigrata McAlpine, 1978
L. interruptovittata Aczel, 1937
L. maculata Thompson, 1910
L. major Malloch, 1921
L. manii Tanasijtshuk, 1968
L. melanopus Tanasijtshuk, 1959
L. militia McAlpine, 1971
L. minor Malloch, 1921
L. morgei Smith, 1963
L. nigraluna McAlpine, 1971
L. obscura Haliday, 1833
L. ocellaris Malloch, 1940
L. parallela Malloch, 1921
L. pemphigae Malloch, 1921
L. pinicola Malloch, 1921
L. piniperda Malloch, 1921
L. psyllidiphaga McLean, 1998
L. pulvinariae Malloch, 1921
L. puncticornis Meigen, 1830
L. simplex Loew, 1869
L. tapiae Blanchard, 1964
L. verticalis Malloch, 1940

References

Further reading

External links

 Diptera.info

Chamaemyiidae
Lauxanioidea genera